Miconia guayaquilensis is a species of plant in the family Melastomataceae. It is endemic to Ecuador.  Its natural habitats are subtropical or tropical dry forests and subtropical or tropical moist lowland forests.

References

Endemic flora of Ecuador
guayaquilensis
Endangered plants
Taxa named by Aimé Bonpland
Taxonomy articles created by Polbot